Greg Godovitz (born March 20, 1951) is a Canadian musician, best known as the bassist and vocalist of the power trio, Goddo. Prior to his success with Goddo, Godovitz was a founding member of Fludd and played in Sherman and Peabody with Buzz Shearman of Moxy and Gil Moore of Triumph.

References

External links
 
 

1951 births
Living people
Canadian rock bass guitarists
Canadian rock singers
Canadian male singers
Canadian songwriters
Musicians from Toronto
Writers from Toronto
Male bass guitarists